The 1977 Spillers Greyhound Derby took place during June with the final being held on 25 June 1977 at White City Stadium.  
The winner was Balliniska Band and the winning owner Raphael Bacci received £17,500. The competition was sponsored by the Spillers.

Final result 
At White City (over 500 metres):

+ Equalled the track record set by Glen Rock

Distances 
2½, 4½, ½, 1¼, 1¼ (lengths)
The distances between the greyhounds are in finishing order and shown in lengths. One length is equal to 0.08 of one second.

Competition Report
The 1977 Derby entries included the defending champion Mutts Silver and Westmead Champ. The ante-post favourite was Glen Rock, who had set a new world record for 525 yards and held the White City track record of 29.16 sec in addition to winning the 1976 Irish Puppy Derby.

The qualifying round ended with 96 greyhounds left in the betting. Glen Rock was eliminated in the very first round in a heat won by Pat Seamur. Balliniska Band lost to Westmead Special in round one and Mutts Silver was beaten by Gaily Noble but both progressed. In the second round Greenfield Fox and Westmead Champ both went out but Ger McKenna's leading entry Red Rasper won well as did Balliniska Band. Balliniska Band then won again in the quarter finals recording 29.24 but Red Rasper was eliminated.

The first semi-final saw Balliniska Band lead out of the traps pursued by El Cavalier, Pat Seamur did well to take third place especially as Balliniska Band equalled the time he had set in the previous round. The second semi ended the hopes of Mutts Silver after he stumbled during the race and finished last behind the victor Westmead Manor, the deposed champion was retired to stud a few days later.

In the final Balliniska Band forced Saucy Buck to check up when going past him, and then he showed good early pace to draw clear. He beat El Cavalier by  lengths in a track-record-equalling 29.16 sec. He was owned by Raphael Bacci and trained by Eddie Moore.

Quarter finals

Semi finals

See also
1977 UK & Ireland Greyhound Racing Year

References

Greyhound Derby
English Greyhound Derby
English Greyhound Derby
English Greyhound Derby